The Taça da Liga de Futsal is the second Portuguese futsal knock-out competition. It was created in 2016 to be disputed in a yearly basis by the eight-best ranked teams of the National Championship at the end of the latter's first half of the regular stage, and is organized by the Portuguese Football Federation.

Benfica are the current holders of the competition, having won it four times, of which three times in a row.

Taça da Liga finals

Performance by club

References

External links
 FPF site

 
Futsal
Futsal competitions in Portugal
Portugal